Geraldo Calábria Lapenda (born December 6, 1925 in Nazaré da Mata; died December 19, 2004 in Recife) was a Brazilian philologist and university professor.

Lapenda is known for his extensive work on the indigenous languages of South America. He spent decades teaching at the Federal University of Pernambuco.

Bibliography

 História da Literatura Latina – apreciacione da obra del Cônego Pedrosa (1948)
 O Condicional no Sistema Verbal Latino (1952)
 Nomes Compostos da Língua Grega (1952)
 Português Comercial – apreciacione sobre o trabalho del Prof. Adauto Pontes (1952)
 Palestra e Ginásio (1953)
 Etimologia da Palavra "Tupã"  (1953)
 Morfologia Histórica do Italiano (1954)
 O Indo-europeu (1954)
 Os Dialetos da Itália (1956)
 O Substantivo Italiano (1959)
 O Dialeto Xucuru (1962)
 Perfil da Língua Yathê (1965)
 Processos Morfológicos e Mudanças Fonéticas (1977)
 Meios de Produção e Transmissão dos Sons da Fala na Linguagem Humana (1980)
 Universidade é reunião de valores (1980)
 Maracutaias (1990)
 Quebra-cabeças (1990)
 Pseudo-etimologias (1990).

Poetry
 Por causa d'um colarinho (1942)
 Xe remirekó (1952)
 Ne te deiciant tribulationes (1955)
 HOMEMULHER (1978)

References

1925 births
2004 deaths
Linguists of indigenous languages of the Americas
Linguists from Brazil
People from Pernambuco
20th-century linguists
Academic staff of the Federal University of Pernambuco